Jair Zaksauskas Ribeiro Ventura (born 19 March 1979), known as Jair Ventura, is a Brazilian professional football coach and former player who played as a forward. Besides Brazil, he has played  in France, Greece, and Gabon.

Playing career
Born in Rio de Janeiro, Ventura was a forward during his playing days, representing São Cristóvão, Bonsucesso, Bangu, Mulhouse and Mesquita, aside from teams in Greece and Gabon. He retired at the age of 26, and subsequently had spells at America-RJ and Madureira.

Coaching career

Botafogo
Ventura joined Botafogo in 2008, also as a fitness trainer. The following year, he was appointed assistant coach by Ney Franco, and remained with the role in the following campaigns.

Ventura took over the first team as an interim on 27 January 2010, in a 2–1 Campeonato Carioca away win against Tigres do Brasil. He returned to his previous role as an assistant after the arrival of Joel Santana, and also managed the under-20 squad for two years before being dismissed by Bota in 2013.

Ventura returned to Botafogo in 2015, after a short spell at CSA. On 13 August 2016, he was definitely appointed as first team coach, replacing São Paulo-bound Ricardo Gomes.

On 19 December 2016, Ventura renewed his contract until the end of 2018, after qualifying Botafogo to the ensuing Copa Libertadores. In that tournament, he took the club to the quarterfinals, being knocked out by eventual champions Grêmio.

Santos
On 22 December 2017, Ventura announced to Botafogo's board that he accepted the offer of league rivals Santos. The following 3 January, he was officially announced by the club.

On 23 July 2018, after a 0–0 away draw against Chapecoense and with Peixe threatened with relegation, Ventura was relieved from his duties.

Corinthians
On 6 September 2018, Ventura was announced head coach of Santos' rivals Corinthians, replacing demoted Osmar Loss. He was sacked on 3 December, with the club only avoiding relegation.

Sport Recife
On 24 August 2020, after more than a year without a club, Ventura replaced Daniel Paulista at the helm of Sport Recife, still in the top tier. He managed to avoid relegation with the club, but was sacked on 5 April 2021 after being knocked out of the 2021 Copa do Brasil and 2021 Copa do Nordeste.

Chapecoense
On 31 May 2021, Ventura was named head coach of Chapecoense, replacing sacked Mozart. On 2 August, after 14 winless matches and with the club in the last place, he was himself dismissed.

Juventude
On 19 October 2021, Ventura replaced sacked Marquinhos Santos ahead of Juventude, his third Série A team in the year. He managed to avoid relegation with the club, but was sacked on 11 February 2022 after a poor start of the new season.

Goiás
On 14 April 2022, Ventura was named head coach of Goiás also in the top tier. On 13 November, after qualifying the club to the 2023 Copa Sudamericana, he left.

Personal life
Ventura is the son of Jairzinho, former Botafogo player and 1970 FIFA World Cup winner.

Coaching statistics

References

External links
 
 

1979 births
Living people
Footballers from Rio de Janeiro (city)
Brazilian people of Lithuanian descent
Brazilian footballers
Association football forwards
São Cristóvão de Futebol e Regatas players
Bonsucesso Futebol Clube players
Bangu Atlético Clube players
Mesquita Futebol Clube players
America Football Club (RJ) players
Madureira Esporte Clube players
FC Mulhouse players
Kalamata F.C. players
Brazilian expatriate footballers
Brazilian expatriate sportspeople in France
Brazilian expatriate sportspeople in Greece
Expatriate footballers in France
Expatriate footballers in Greece
Expatriate footballers in Gabon
Brazilian football managers
Campeonato Brasileiro Série A managers
Botafogo de Futebol e Regatas managers
Santos FC managers
Sport Club Corinthians Paulista managers
Sport Club do Recife managers
Associação Chapecoense de Futebol managers
Esporte Clube Juventude managers
Goiás Esporte Clube managers